Abraham Walker is the name of:

 Abraham Walker (soldier) (1839–1935), Argentine army officer
 Abraham Beverley Walker (1851–1909), black Canadian lawyer